Schnabel is a German surname meaning "beak". Notable people with the surname include:

Arthur Schnabel (1948–2018), German judoka
Artur Schnabel (1882–1951), Polish-Austrian classical pianist and composer, husband of Therese Schnabel
Charles Schnabel (1895–1974), American agricultural chemist
Enrico Schnabel (born 1974), German rower
Ernst Schnabel (1913–1986), German writer
Isabel Schnabel, german economist, Board member of the European Central Bank
Johann Gottfried Schnabel (1692–1751/8), German author
Julian Schnabel (born 1951), American painter and filmmaker
Karl Ulrich Schnabel (1909–2001), German classical pianist, son of Artur and Therese Schnabel
Parker Schnabel (born c. 1995), American gold miner and cast member of the Discovery Channel series Gold Rush
Paul Schnabel (born 1948), Dutch sociologist
Robert Schnabel (ice hockey) (born 1978), Czech-born professional ice hockey defenseman
Robert B. Schnabel (born 1950), American computer scientist
Rockwell A. Schnabel (born 1936), American businessman and diplomat
Stefan Schnabel (1912–1999), German actor, son of Artur and Therese Schnabel
Therese Schnabel (1876–1959), German contralto, spouse of Artur Schnabel

See also 

Schnabel car, a specialized type of railroad freight car
Plague doctor, "Doktor Schnabel von Rom"
O. P. Schnabel Park, a City Park in San Antonio, Texas
Schnabl (surname)

German-language surnames